Hothouse Creations was a UK computer game developer, founded in 1996. Their first game Gangsters: Organized Crime, sold over 500,000 copies worldwide.

In 2004, it was acquired by ZOO Digital The last game it developed was Crime Life: Gang Wars.

Notable games
Gangsters: Organized Crime (1998)
Abomination: The Nemesis Project (1999)
Cutthroats: Terror on the High Seas (1999)
Who Wants to Be a Millionaire? (1999)
Gangsters 2 (2001)
Casino, Inc. (2003)
American Idol / Pop Idol (2003)
Crime Life: Gang Wars (2005)

References

Defunct companies based in Bristol
Defunct video game companies of the United Kingdom
Video game companies established in 1996
Video game companies disestablished in 2007
Video game development companies